The 1986–87 Minnesota North Stars season was the North Stars' 20th season.

Coached by Lorne Henning (30–39–9) and Glen Sonmor (0–1–1), the team compiled a record of 30–40–10 for 70 points, to finish the regular season 5th in the Norris Division and failed to qualify for the playoffs for the first time since 1979.

Offseason

Regular season

Final standings

Schedule and results

Playoffs

Player statistics

Awards and records

Transactions

Draft picks
Minnesota's draft picks at the 1986 NHL Entry Draft held at the Montreal Forum in Montreal, Quebec.

Farm teams

See also
1986–87 NHL season

References

External links

Minn
Minn
Minnesota North Stars seasons
Minnesota Twins
Minnesota Twins